The 2016 CEV U20 Volleyball European Championship is the 25th edition of the Men's Junior European Volleyball Championship, organised by CEV. It will be played in Bulgaria from 2 to 10 September 2016.

Poland won the gold medals for a second time in the history of the competition after claiming the title 20 years ago.

Participating teams
Host Country

Qualified through 2016 Men's U20 Volleyball European Championship Qualification

Pools composition

Venues

Preliminary round
All times are Eastern European Summer Time (UTC+03:00)

Pool I

|}

|}

Pool II

|}

|}

Final round
All times are Eastern European Summer Time (UTC+03:00)

5th–8th place

5th–8th semifinals

|}

7th place match

|}

5th place match

|}

Final

Semifinals

|}

3rd place match

|}

Final

|}

Final standing

Individual awards

Most Valuable Player
  Oleh Plotnytskyi
Best Setter
  Riccardo Sbertoli
Best Outside Spikers
  Oleh Plotnytskyi
  Bartosz Kwolek

Best Middle Blockers
  Aleksei Kononov
  Gianluca Galassi
Best Opposite Spiker
  Jakub Ziobrowski
Best Libero
  Stanislav Dramov

See also
2016 Women's U19 Volleyball European Championship

References

External links
 Official website

Men's Junior European Volleyball Championship
European Championship U20
International volleyball competitions hosted by Bulgaria
2016 in Bulgarian sport
2016 in youth sport
Sport in Plovdiv
Sport in Varna, Bulgaria
September 2016 sports events in Europe